Anna McPartlin (born 1972) is an Irish novelist. Her novel Pack Up the Moon (2006) was her debut feature.

Biography
Anna McPartlin was born in Dublin, Ireland, in 1972. As a teenager she grew up with her aunt and uncle as a fosterling in Kenmare, County Kerry. She studied marketing before working as a stand-up comedian. Her novels (since 2006) were translated into German. She is married and lives in Dublin.

Novels
 Pack Up the Moon (2006)
 Apart from the Crowd  (2007) also published as No Way to Say Goodbye (2009)
 The Truth Will Out (2008) also known in the states as As Sure As the Sun
 Alexandra Gone (2010) also published as The One I Love (2010)
 The Space Between Us (2011)
 Somewhere Inside Of Happy (2015)
 The Last Days of Rabbit Hayes (2015)
 Below the Big Blue Sky (2020)
 " Waiting for a Miracle" (2021)

References

External links
 Anna goes through life by the book

1972 births
Irish women novelists
Living people
People from County Dublin
People from Kenmare